The Ambassador of Australia to Switzerland is an officer of the Australian Department of Foreign Affairs and Trade and the head of the Embassy of the Commonwealth of Australia to the Swiss Confederation. The ambassador has the rank and status of an Ambassador Extraordinary and Plenipotentiary and also holds non-resident accreditation for Liechtenstein (since 2022). From 1974 to 1993 and since November 2022 there has been a resident ambassador in Bern. The current ambassador since 22 November 2022 is Elizabeth Day.

Heads of mission

Notes 
 Also non-resident Ambassador to the Principality of Liechtenstein, 1999–2022 (Bonn/Berlin), 2022–date (Bern).

References

External links

Australian Embassy in Bern and the Australian Permanent Mission and Consulate-General in Geneva

 
 
Switzerland
Australia